The IOOF Lodge in Alton, Kansas was built in 1885.  It served historically as a business and as a meeting hall.  It was listed on the National Register of Historic Places in 2002.

References

Cultural infrastructure completed in 1885
Buildings and structures in Osborne County, Kansas
Odd Fellows buildings in Kansas
Clubhouses on the National Register of Historic Places in Kansas
National Register of Historic Places in Osborne County, Kansas

Former National Register of Historic Places in Kansas